Nikola Simeonov (born 19 November 1939) is a Bulgarian former long-distance runner. He competed in the marathon at the 1968 Summer Olympics. He finished in 42nd place.

References

External links
 

1939 births
Living people
Athletes (track and field) at the 1968 Summer Olympics
Bulgarian male long-distance runners
Bulgarian male marathon runners
Olympic athletes of Bulgaria
People from Petrich
Sportspeople from Blagoevgrad Province